Shallowford is an unincorporated community in Unicoi County, in the U.S. state of Tennessee.

History
The community was likely named from the ford on a nearby shallow stream.

References

Unincorporated communities in Unicoi County, Tennessee
Unincorporated communities in Tennessee